The 18th United States Colored Infantry Regiment was an African-American infantry regiment, raised in the state of Missouri, which served in the Union Army during the American Civil War.

Service
Organized in Missouri at large February 1 to September 28, 1864. Unlike other African-American regiments from the State of Missouri, the regiment was mustered directly into U.S., rather than state service.

Attached to District of St. Louis, Mo., Department of Missouri, to December 1864. Unassigned, District of the Etowah, Department of the Cumberland, December 1864. 1st Colored Brigade, District of the Etowa, Dept. of the Cumberland, to January 1865. Unassigned, District of the Etowah, Dept. of the Cumberland, March 1865. 1st Colored Brigade, Dept. of the Cumberland, to July 1865. 2nd Brigade, 4th Division, District of East Tennessee and Department of the Tennessee, to February 1866.

Detailed Service
Duty in District of St. Louis, Mo., and at St. Louis until November 1864. Ordered to Nashville, Tenn., November 7. Moved to Paducah, Kentucky, November 7–11, thence to Nashville, Tenn. Occupation of Nashville during Hood's investment December 1–15. Battles of Nashville December 15–16. Pursuit of Hood to the Tennessee River December 17–28. At Bridgeport, Alabama, guarding railroad until February 1865. Action at Elrod's Tan Yard January 27. At Chattanooga, Tennessee, and in District of East Tennessee until February 1866. Mustered out February 21, 1866.

Commanders
Colonel

See also

List of Missouri Civil War Units
List of United States Colored Troops Civil War units
Missouri in the American Civil War
1st Missouri Regiment of Colored Infantry
2nd Missouri Regiment of Colored Infantry
3rd Missouri Regiment of Colored Infantry
4th Missouri Regiment of Colored Infantry
Lincoln University of Missouri

Notes

The 62nd, not 63rd, was the first black regiment raised in Missouri. The 62nd, 65th, 67th and 68th were initially mustered in as Missouri Volunteers of African Descent.

References
 Dyer, Frederick H. A Compendium of the War of the Rebellion (Des Moines, IA:  Dyer Pub. Co.), 1908.
 
The Civil War Archive
Web site discussing the organization of Missouri "Colored Infantry", including discussions of conditions at Benton Barracks during the winter of 1863-1864. http://www.usgennet.org/usa/mo/county/stlouis/ct.htm
 Web side discussing participation of veterans of Missouri's Civil War African-American regiments in the founding of Lincoln University. http://www.buffalosoldier.net/62nd65thRegimentsU.S.ColoredInfantry.htm
Lincoln University web site discussing the role of veterans of Missouri's African-American regiments in the establishment of the University. http://www.lincolnu.edu/web/about-lincoln/our-history
Link to waymarking site for the Soldier-Founder's Memorial at Lincoln University. http://www.waymarking.com/waymarks/WM5QWY

Units and formations of the Union Army from Missouri
United States Colored Troops Civil War units and formations
Military units and formations established in 1865
Military units and formations disestablished in 1866
1864 establishments in Missouri
1866 disestablishments in Tennessee